The extensor digitorum brevis muscle (sometimes EDB) is a muscle on the upper surface of the foot that helps extend digits 2 through 4.

Structure
The muscle originates from the forepart of the upper and lateral surface of the calcaneus (in front of the groove for the peroneus brevis tendon), from the interosseous talocalcaneal ligament and the stem of the inferior extensor retinaculum. The fibres pass obliquely forwards and medially across the dorsum of the foot and end in four tendons. The medial part of the muscle, also known as extensor hallucis brevis, ends in a tendon which crosses the dorsalis pedis artery and inserts into the dorsal surface of the base of the proximal phalanx of the great toe. The other three tendons insert into the lateral sides of the tendons of extensor digitorum longus for the second, third and fourth toes.

Nerve supply
Nerve supply: lateral terminal branch of Deep Peroneal Nerve (deep fibular nerve) (proximal sciatic branches L4-L5, but most clinically relevant L5 with L4/L5 spinal disc herniation causing L5 lesion). Same innervation of Extensor Hallucis Brevis

Function
Extensor digitorum brevis extends the first four digits at the metatarsophalangeal joint and assists in extending the second, third and fourth digits at the interphalangeal joint. The fifth digit, lacking any insertion from extensor digitorum brevis, can only be raised by the long extensor.

Additional images

See also
 Extensor digitorum longus muscle
 Extensor hallucis brevis
 Extensor digitorum muscle

External links

  - "The Foot: Muscles"
 
 PTCentral

Calf muscles
Muscles of the lower limb